Sinus may refer to:

Anatomy
 Sinus (anatomy), a sac or cavity in any organ or tissue
 Paranasal sinuses, air cavities in the cranial bones, especially those near the nose, including:
 Maxillary sinus, is the largest of the paranasal sinuses, under the eyes, in the maxillary bones
 Frontal sinus, superior to the eyes, in the frontal bone, which forms the hard part of the forehead
 Ethmoid sinus, formed from several discrete air cells within the ethmoid bone between the eyes and under the nose
 Sphenoidal sinus, in the sphenoid bone at the center of the skull base under the pituitary gland
 Anal sinuses, the furrows which separate the columns in the rectum
 Dural venous sinuses, venous channels found between layers of dura mater in the brain
 Sinus (botany), a space or indentation, usually on a leaf

Heart
 Sinus node, a structure in the superior part of the right atrium
 Sinus rhythm, normal beating on an ECG
 Coronary sinus, a vein collecting blood from the heart
 Sinus venosus, a cavity in the heart of embryos              
 Sinus venarum, a part of the wall of the right atrium in adults, developed from the sinus venosus

Other uses
 Sinus (Chalcidice), a town of ancient Chalcidice, Greece
 Sinus, gulf or bay in Latin, used in numerous toponyms in ancient writing (e.g., Sinus Magnus, Sinus Flanaticus, etc.)
 Sine, a trigonometric math function (Latin sinus)

See also
 Sinus Medii, a small lunar mare
 Sinus Successus, a lunar feature
 Sines, a municipality in Alentejo, Portugal (Latin Sinus)
 Sinusitis, a common ailment resulting in the inflammation of the paranasal sinuses